Tomas Evjen (10 October 1972 – 11 September 2012) was a Norwegian editor, media personality and film producer.

Biography
He appeared in Radio Saltdal when he was 12 years old and later worked as a journalist in Nordlandsposten. In 1996, he became editor and general manager of Saltenposten until 2000. He also worked as a reporter for Se og Hør. In 2001, he founded his own media and film company "News On Request AS" in Saltdal which he later moved to Bodø. The company won the Sparebanken Nord-Norges industry award in 2005. He also became the general manager of Mediegården in Bodø.

He produced a number of films and shorts including Dead Snow in 2009 and the documentary Pappa kom hem in 2010. At the time of his death, he was producing a film with Norwegian director Nils Gaup about the miners' rebellion in Sulis. Dead Snow was nominated for Amanda award becoming a best-selling Norwegian films abroad.

Death
He died on 11 September 2012 and his body was discovered in the Mediegården in Bodø.

Filmography

Director
2009: Near the Mountains

Producer
2009: Dead Snow
2010: Pappa kom hem (documentary) 
Shorts
2007: Burgled
2007: Fluen
2009: Near the Mountains (co-producer)
2011: Skallamann (producer / executive producer)
2011: I enden av tauet (executive producer)

Cinematographer
2002: Montagna con forza
2009: Near the Mountains (short) 
2010: Pappa kom hem (documentary) 
2011: I enden av tauet (short)

References

External links

1972 births
2012 deaths
Norwegian film producers
Norwegian newspaper editors
People from Saltdal